HMS Bulwark is the second ship of the Royal Navy's  assault ships. She is one of  the United Kingdom's two amphibious transport docks designed to put Royal Marines ashore by air and by sea.

Although launched in 2001, delays caused the delivery date to be put back, and the ship entered service In 28 April 2005. Between October 2011 and June 2015 she was the fleet flagship of the Royal Navy. She has been in extended upkeep since 2020. The ship is designed to send large numbers of troops and vehicles to shore as quickly as possible. Bulwark has supported a permanently embarked Royal Marines landing craft unit, 4 Assault Squadron Royal Marines. The rear of Bulwark opens and floods a compartment, allowing the boats inside to be launched. The  flight deck is able to take two Sea King HC4 or Merlin medium-lift helicopters and stow a third. The deck can also support two Chinook heavy-lift helicopters, one down the side of the flight deck and one at the rear of the flight deck. Although the Albion design does not have a hangar, the ship has sufficient equipment to support helicopter operations.

Bulwark was launched at the BAE Systems shipyard at Barrow-in-Furness, Cumbria, on 15 November 2001. She is, to date, the most recent surface vessel to have been constructed at Barrow with the yard currently specialising in submarine construction.

Operational history
Bulwark departed the UK in January 2006 for a six-month East of Suez maiden deployment. She conducted counter-terrorist and counter-piracy tasks in waters off the Horn of Africa. Bulwark then headed for the northern Persian Gulf to become the flagship of Task Force 158, providing security for Iraqi oil platforms. At the start of mid 2006 Bulwark was near Spain. Due to the 2006 Israel–Lebanon crisis, on 15 July 2006 she was ordered to divert to Lebanon and to support operations evacuating British citizens from the conflict area. On 20 July, she evacuated approximately 1,300 people from Beirut in the biggest British evacuation. On completion of her extended deployment the ship returned to the United Kingdom. At the start of June 2007 Bulwark was berthed at Sunderland on the River Wear.

In October 2008, Bulwark was at the Tail of the Bank in the Firth of Clyde together with the aircraft carrier  and the French amphibious ship , taking part in Exercise Joint Warrior 2008.

On 18 February 2009, Bulwark sailed from Devonport as flagship to Commander UK Amphibious Task Group, Commodore Peter Hudson, on the Taurus 09 deployment.

In May 2010, she entered a dry-dock at HMNB Devonport to refit, eventually rejoining the fleet in March 2011, and then took over as fleet flagship from her sister ship Albion in October 2011. She made a five-day visit to London on 16 March 2011. Bulwark undertook Operational Sea Training at the end of June 2011 in preparation to take up the role of fleet flagship of the Royal Navy. Bulwark was on standby as leading ship of the UK's recently formed Response Force Task Group. In October she participated in Exercise Joint Warrior in Loch Eriboll, the largest war games staged in the UK, involving the French Marines and other NATO forces.

On 15 February 2012, Bulwark made an unscheduled stop in Kiel, Germany, after ice on the Elbe river prevented her from entering the city of Hamburg as originally planned. She also hosted onboard over 4,000 people from the city. The vessel had entered the Baltic Sea to prepare for  Exercise 'Cold Response', a NATO winter war games exercise due to take place in northern Norway in March 2012. She was part of the COUGAR 13 task group, with the Commander UK Task Group and his staff embarked on board. She was visited by the Commander of Naval Striking and Support Forces NATO.

At the end of May 2014, Bulwark visited Greenwich in London, where the public were able to visit the ship for tours conducted by the crew, and she also took part in celebrations marking the 350th anniversary of the formation of the Royal Marines. In late 2014 Bulwark was deployed for the COUGAR 14 Response Force Task Group annual exercise and the International Mine Counter Measures Exercise (IMCMEX).

Between April and July 2015 Bulwark was allocated to Operation Weald, the upgraded search and rescue operation of the Italian coast for migrants crossing from Libya. She was assisted by three Merlin HM.2 helicopters from 814 Naval Air Squadron. Bulwark recovered over 2,900 migrants from the sea during the operation. Bulwark assisted in providing security for the Commonwealth Heads of Government Meeting held in Malta in November. This duty was completed in December 2015.

In 2016, the ship was the flagship for Exercise Griffin Strike, the validation exercise for the Anglo-French Combined Joint Expeditionary Force, after which she participated in the Centenary commemorations for the Battle of Jutland in Scapa Flow. In July, the ship came alongside Sunderland and exercised the Freedom of the City of Durham with a full ceremonial parade through the streets, finishing with a service at St Cuthbert's Cathedral. In September 2016, the ship again acted as the flagship for the Joint Expeditionary Force (Maritime) 16 deployment (the new name for the COUGAR series of deployments) and, with COMATG embarked, deployed for exercises off (and with) Albania, France, Israel, Somaliland, and Oman.

As announced in 2011, Bulwark entered extended readiness (uncrewed reserve) in early 2017, and transferred her role as Fleet Amphibious Flagship to her sister ship Albion on her emergence from refit.

According to the Ministry of Defence, the planned out-of-service date for Bulwark is 2034. However, in October 2017, the BBC's Newsnight reported that the Ministry of Defence was considering decommissioning Bulwark and Albion as part of a package of cost-cutting measures intended to mitigate the expense of the Royal Navy's two new aircraft carriers. This action was reversed by then Secretary of State for Defence Gavin Williamson in September 2018.

In late 2020 Bulwark was dry-docked for phase two of her optimised support period. The ship is to remain in dry dock prior to undertaking a phase 3 "recertification package" ahead of her planned return to the fleet in 2023.

In the media
Bulwark is the featured ship in the second series of Warship originally shown on television channel Five in the UK.  The season followed her during the Taurus 09 deployment.

Affiliations
In 2015 HMS Bulwark supported the following affiliations:
 County Durham
 Royal Irish Regiment
 Worshipful Company of Coachmakers and Coach Harness Makers
 HMS Bulwark, Albion, and Centaur Association
 RAF Odiham
 St. Aloysius' College Scout Group
 Bishop of Durham
 Forest of Teesdale Primary School, Co Durham
 Durham Trinity School and Sports College
 Monkton Combe School Combined Cadet Force
 Training Ship Adventure, Bristol Sea Cadet Corps
 Training Ship Rhyl, Sea Cadet Corps
 Giggleswick School Combined Cadet Force
 Bishop Auckland Hospital
 Bidwell Brook School

References

External links

Royal Navy HMS Bulwark (royalnavy.mod.uk)

 

Albion-class landing platform docks
Amphibious warfare vessels of the Royal Navy
Amphibious warfare vessels of the United Kingdom
Ships built in Barrow-in-Furness
2001 ships